Son Bo Aung Din is a 1955 Burmese black-and-white drama film, directed by Shwe Done Bi Aung starring Kyaw Swe, Myint Myint Khin, Khin Ohn Myint, Htun Wai, Ba Chit and May May Win. The film is about Bo Aung Din's son "Bo Mya Din" and is a sequel to Bo Aung Din.

Cast
Kyaw Swe as Bo Mya Din
Myint Myint Khin as A Mar
Khin Ohn Myint as Kyar Khin Sein
Htun Wai as Htun Wai
Ba Chit as U Ba Chit
May May Win as Ma Mya Win
Jolly Swe as Jolly

See also
Bo Aung Din

References

1955 films
1950s Burmese-language films
Films shot in Myanmar
Burmese black-and-white films
Burmese drama films
1955 drama films